Jerome Tomas Frankenberger (March 6, 1935 – January 18, 2019) was a Canadian football player who played for the Edmonton Eskimos and Saskatchewan Roughriders. He played college football at the University of Kentucky.

References

1935 births
2019 deaths
American football tackles
American players of Canadian football
Canadian football offensive linemen
Edmonton Elks players
Kentucky Wildcats football players
Players of American football from Louisville, Kentucky
Players of Canadian football from Louisville, Kentucky
Saskatchewan Roughriders players